Arthur Wells (4 September 1900 – 27 December 1964) was an Australian cricketer. He played nine first-class matches for New South Wales between 1920/21 and 1924/25.

See also
 List of New South Wales representative cricketers

References

External links
 

1900 births
1964 deaths
Australian cricketers
New South Wales cricketers
Cricketers from Sydney